Blandino is a surname. Notable people with the surname include:
Alex Blandino (born 1992), Nicaraguan-American baseball player
Dean Blandino (born 1971), American football officiator and rules analyst
Joe Blandino (born 1992), Dominican musician
Xiomara Blandino (born 1984), Nicaraguan beauty pageant contestant, Miss Nicaragua 2007